The year 2011 is the fourth year in the history of Ultimate Challenge MMA, a mixed martial arts promotion based in the United Kingdom. In 2011 Ultimate Challenge MMA held 11 events beginning with, UCMMA 18 - Face Off.

Events list

UCMMA 18: Face Off

UCMMA 18: Face Off was an event held on February 5, 2011, at The Troxy in London, England, United Kingdom.

Results

UCMMA 19: Lights Out

UCMMA 19: Lights Out was an event held on March 26, 2011, at The Troxy in London, England, United Kingdom.

Results

UCMMA 20: Fists of Fire

UCMMA 20: Fists of Fire was an event held on May 14, 2011, at The Troxy in London, England, United Kingdom.

Results

UCMMA 21: Stand Your Ground

UCMMA 21: Stand Your Ground was an event held on June 25, 2011, at The Troxy in London, England, United Kingdom.

Results

UCMMA 22: Warrior Creed

UCMMA 22: Warrior Creed was an event held on August 6, 2011, at The Troxy in London, England, United Kingdom.

Results

UCMMA 23: Go 4 It

UCMMA 23: Go 4 It was an event held on September 17, 2011, at The Troxy in London, England, United Kingdom.

Results

UCMMA 24: Hands of War

UCMMA 24: Hands of War was an event held on October 22, 2011, at The Troxy in London, England, United Kingdom.

Results

UCMMA: Dominican Republic

UCMMA: Dominican Republic was an event held on November 6, 2011, at the Hard Rock Casino in Punta Cana, Dominican Republic.

Results

UCMMA: Contenders

UCMMA: Contenders was an event held on November 6, 2011, in Brighton, East Sussex, England.

Results

White Collar MMA 2

White Collar MMA 2 was an event held on November 12, 2011, at The Troxy in London, England, United Kingdom.

UCMMA 25: The Beat Down

UCMMA 25: The Beat Down was an event held on December 3, 2011, at The Troxy in London, England, United Kingdom.

Results

References

Ultimate Challenge MMA events
2011 in mixed martial arts